Chōkai may refer to:
 Two warships of the Imperial Japanese Navy:
 , a Takao-class heavy cruiser, which saw service in World War II
 , a Maya-class gunboat, which saw service in the First Sino-Japanese War and the Russo-Japanese War
 One warship of the Japan Maritime Self-Defense Force
 Japanese destroyer , a Kongō-class guided missile destroyer commissioned in 1998
 Chōkai, Akita, a town merged to form the new city of Yurihonjō, Japan
 Mount Chōkai, a prominent mountain in northern Japan
 9110 Choukai, an asteroid